The 1974 WHA Amateur Draft was the second amateur draft held by the World Hockey Association. The first two rounds of the draft were conducted in secret in February and only graduating junior players (born in 1954) were eligible for selection. The remaining rounds were conducted on May 31.

However, the WHA had reached an agreement with the Canadian Amateur Hockey Association between the two draft sessions, which permitted the WHA teams to draft one underage junior player (born in 1955 or 1956) in either the first or second round. As a result, the WHA renumbered the rounds of the draft, indicating that the first two rounds—conducted in February—were now rounds three and four, while the first two rounds conducted in May were rounds one and two, keeping them eligible to draft the underage players.


Selections by round

Listed below are the selections made in the 1974 WHA Amateur Draft.

Secret Amateur Draft

Round 1 (February)

Round 2 (February)

Amateur Draft

Round 1 (May)

Round 2 (May)

Round 3

Round 4

Round 5

Round 6

Round 7

Round 8

Round 9

Round 10

Round 11

Round 12

Round 13

Round 14

Round 15

Round 16

Round 17

Round 18

Round 19

See also
1974 NHL amateur draft
1974–75 WHA season

References
1974 WHA Amateur Draft on Hockeydb.com
1974 WHA Secret Amateur Draft on Hockeydb.com

WHA Amateur Drafts
Draft